Jobst Harrich (baptized 30 September 1579 – buried 11 April 1617) was a German painter best known as a copyist of Albrecht Dürer, born and dead in Nuremberg.

Sources
 Manfred H. Grieb (ed.): Nürnberger Künstlerlexikon: Bildende Künstler, Kunsthandwerker, Gelehrte, Sammler, Kulturschaffende und Mäzene vom 12. bis zur Mitte des 20. Jahrhunderts. Munich: Saur K.G. Verlag GmbH, September 2007,

External links 

 Entry for Jobst Harrich on the Union List of Artist Names

16th-century German painters
German male painters
17th-century German painters
Artists from Nuremberg
1579 births
1617 deaths